South Malabar refers to a geographical area of the southwestern coast of India covering some parts of the present-day Kerala. South Malabar covers the regions included in present-day Kozhikode taluk of Kozhikode district, the whole area of Malappuram district, Chavakkad taluk of Thrissur district, and Palakkad district, excluding parts of Chittur taluk. The Fort Kochi region of Kochi city also historically belongs to South Malabar. The term South Malabar refers to the region of the erstwhile Malabar District south to the river Korapuzha, and bears a high cultural similarity to both the Cochin (Thrissur-Kochi region) and the North Malabar region.

Under British rule, South Malabar's chief importance lay in producing coconut, pepper, and tiles. In the old administrative records of the Madras Presidency, it is recorded that the most remarkable plantation owned by government in the erstwhile Madras Presidency was the teak plantation at Nilambur, planted in 1844. The region of South Malabar and the ports at Beypore and Fort Kochi had some sort of importance in the erstwhile Madras Presidency as it was one of the two districts of the presidency that lay on the western Malabar Coast, thus accessing the marine route through the Arabian Sea. The first railway line of Kerala, from Tirur to Beypore, was laid for it.

Kozhikode is the largest city in South Malabar, which is followed by Palakkad. The South Malabar region is bounded by North Malabar (Korapuzha) to north, the hilly region of Nilgiris and Palakkad Gap which connects Coimbatore to east, Cochin to south, and Arabian Sea to west. The historical regions of Nediyiruppu Swaroopam, Eranad, Valluvanad, Parappanad, Kavalappara, Vettathunadu, Nilambur Kingdom, Nedungadis, and Palakkad, are included in the South Malabar. The longest three rivers of Malabar region, namely Bharathappuzha, Chaliyar, and Kadalundi Rivers, flow through South Malabar.

Etymology
Until the arrival of British, the term Malabar was used in foreign trade circles as a general name for Kerala. Earlier, the term Malabar had also been used to denote Tulu Nadu and Kanyakumari which lie contiguous to Kerala in the southwestern coast of India, in addition to the modern state of Kerala. The people of Malabar were known as Malabars. Still the term Malabar is often used to denote the entire southwestern coast of India. From the time of Cosmas Indicopleustes (6th century CE) itself, the Arab sailors used to call Kerala as Male. The first element of the name, however, is attested already in the Topography written by Cosmas Indicopleustes. This mentions a pepper emporium called Male, which clearly gave its name to Malabar ('the country of Male'). The name Male is thought to come from the Malayalam word Mala ('hill'). Al-Biruni (AD 973 - 1048) must have been the first writer to call this state Malabar.  Authors such as Ibn Khordadbeh and Al-Baladhuri mention Malabar ports in their works. The Arab writers had called this place Malibar, Manibar, Mulibar, and Munibar. Malabar is reminiscent of the word Malanad which means the land of hills. According to William Logan, the word Malabar comes from a combination of the Malayalam word Mala (hill) and the Persian/Arabic word Barr (country/continent).

History

Ancient era
The ancient port of Tyndis, which was located on the northern side of Muziris, as mentioned in the Periplus of the Erythraean Sea, was somewhere near Kozhikode. Its exact location is a matter of dispute. The suggested locations are Ponnani, Tanur, Beypore-Chaliyam-Kadalundi-Vallikkunnu, and Koyilandy. Tyndis was a major center of trade, next only to Muziris, but also between the Cheras and the Roman Empire. The region around Coimbatore was ruled by the Cheras during Sangam period between 1st and the 4th centuries CE and it served as the eastern entrance to the Palakkad Gap, the principal inland trade route between the Malabar Coast and Coromandel Coast.

Pliny the Elder (1st century CE) states that the port of Tyndis was located at the northwestern border of Keprobotos (Chera dynasty). The North Malabar region, which lies north of the port at Tyndis, was ruled by the kingdom of Ezhimala during Sangam period. According to the Periplus of the Erythraean Sea, a region known as Limyrike began at Naura and Tyndis. However the Ptolemy mentions only Tyndis as the Limyrike'''s starting point. The region probably ended at Kanyakumari; it thus roughly corresponds to the present-day Malabar Coast. The value of Rome's annual trade with the region was estimated at around 50,000,000 sesterces. Pliny the Elder mentioned that Limyrike was prone by pirates. The Cosmas Indicopleustes mentioned that the Limyrike was a source of peppers.Das, Santosh Kumar (2006). The Economic History of Ancient India. Genesis Publishing Pvt Ltd. p. 301.

Early Middle Ages
The Kurumathur inscription found near Areekode dates back to 871 CE. Three inscriptions written in Old Malayalam date back to 932 CE, those were found from Triprangode (near Tirunavaya), Kottakkal, and Chaliyar, mention the name of Goda Ravi of Chera dynasty. The Triprangode inscription states about the agreement of Thavanur. Several inscriptions written in Old Malayalam those date back to 10th century CE, have found from Sukapuram near Edappal, which was one of the 64 old Nambudiri villages of Kerala. Descriptions about the rulers of Eranad and Valluvanad regions can be seen in the Jewish copper plates of Bhaskara Ravi Varman (around 1000 CE) and Viraraghava copper plates  of Veera Raghava Chakravarthy (around 1225 CE). Eranad was ruled by a Samanthan Nair clan known as Eradis, similar to the Vellodis of neighbouring Valluvanad and Nedungadis of Nedunganad. The rulers of Valluvanad were known by the title Eralppad/Eradi. It was the ruler of Eranad who later became the Zamorin of Calicut by annexing the port town of Calicut from Polanad, which was vassal to Kolathunadu. The ruler of Kingdom of Cochin also traces back to Ponnani in South Malabar. South Malabar was also the seat of the kingdoms of Parappanad, Vettathunadu, Valluvanadu, Nedungadis, and Palakkad. Parappanad royal family is a cousin dynasty of the Travancore royal family. The Azhvanchery Thamprakkal were the feudal lords of Athavanad. Tirunavaya, the seat of Mamankam festival, lies on the bank of the river Bharathappuzha. Marthanda Varma, the founder of Travancore, belongs to Parappanad royal family. A 13th century granite inscription, written in a mixture of Old Malayalam and Arabic, at Muchundi Mosque in Kozhikode mentions a donation by the king to the mosque.

Rise of Kozhikode

The Zamorin of Calicut, who was the most powerful ruler of Kerala during the middle ages, was mainly the ruler of South Malabar, and Kozhikode was the largest city on Malabar Coast under his rule. Under the Zamorin, South Malabar emerged as one of the leading centres of maritime trade in the Indian subcontinent. Arabs had a monopoly on foreign trade. Other major kingdoms based at South Malabar included the Kingdom of Valluvanad and Palakkad.

In the 14th century, Kozhikode conquered larger parts of central Kerala after the seize of Tirunavaya region from Valluvanad, which were under the control of the king of Perumbadappu Swaroopam (Cochin). The ruler of Perumpadappu was forced to shift his capital (c. CE 1405) further south from Kodungallur to Kochi. In the 15th century, the status of Cochin was reduced to a vassal state of Kozhikode, thus leading to the emergence of Kozhikode as the most powerful kingdom in medieval Malabar Coast.

Kozhikode was the largest city in the Indian state of Kerala under the rule of Zamorin of Calicut, an independent kingdom based at Kozhikode. It remained so until 18th century CE. The port at Kozhikode was the gateway to South Indian coast for the Arabs, the Portuguese, the Dutch, and finally the British. The Kunjali Marakkars, who were the naval chief of the Zamorin of Kozhikode, are credited with organizing the first naval defense of the Indian coast. Under British Raj, it acted as the headquarters of Malabar District, one of the two districts in the western coast of erstwhile Madras Presidency. The port at Kozhikode held the superior economic and political position in medieval Kerala coast, while Kannur, Kollam, and Kochi, were commercially important secondary ports, where the traders from various parts of the world would gather. The Portuguese arrived at Kappad Kozhikode in 1498 during the Age of Discovery, thus opening a direct sea route from Europe to South Asia. In 1664, the municipality of Fort Kochi was established by Dutch Malabar, making it the first municipality in Indian subcontinent, which got dissolved when the Dutch authority got weaker in 18th century.

At the peak of their reign, the Zamorins of Kozhikode ruled over a region from Kollam (Quilon) in the south to Panthalayini Kollam (Koyilandy) in the north.K. V. Krishna Iyer, Zamorins of Calicut: From the earliest times to AD 1806. Calicut: Norman Printing Bureau, 1938. They were the most powerful rulers on Malabar Coast and Kozhikode was the largest city of Kerala until the Portuguese era. The Zamorin of Calicut, who was originally the ruler of Eranad based at Nediyiruppu, developed the port at Kozhikode and changed his headquarters to there for maritime trade. Ibn Battuta (1342–1347), who visited the city of Kozhikode six times, gives the earliest glimpses of life in the city. He describes Kozhikode as "one of the great ports of the district of Malabar" where "merchants of all parts of the world are found". The king of this place, he says, "shaves his chin just as the Haidari Fakeers of Rome do... The greater part of the Muslim merchants of this place are so wealthy that one of them can purchase the whole freightage of such vessels put here and fit-out others like them". Ma Huan (1403 AD), the Chinese sailor part of the Imperial Chinese fleet under Cheng Ho (Zheng He) states the city as a great emporium of trade frequented by merchants from around the world. He makes note of the 20 or 30 mosques built to cater to the religious needs of the Muslims, the unique system of calculation by the merchants using their fingers and toes (followed to this day), and the matrilineal system of succession. Abdur Razzak (1442–43), Niccolò de' Conti (1445), Afanasy Nikitin (1468–74), Ludovico di Varthema (1503–1508), and Duarte Barbosa witnessed the city as one of the major trading centres in the Indian subcontinent where traders from different parts of the world could be seen.Gangadharan. M., The Land of Malabar: The Book of Barbosa (2000), Vol II, M.G University, Kottayam.Azhvanchery Thamprakkal, who were considered as the supreme head of Nambudiri Brahmins of Kerala during the middle ages, were also natives of South Malabar. Tirunavaya, the hub of Mamankam festival and Ponnani, which was the largest hub of Islamic studies in Kerala, during the middle ages, lie in South Malabar. South Malabar is home to three of Kerala's six longest rivers, Chaliyar, Kadalundi River, and Bharathappuzha river. South Malabar was and still is the main hub of Malayalam literature. The river Bharathappuzha has played a major role in shaping the distinct culture of Kerala. Traditionally South Malabar has remained the source of an erstwhile aristocracy for many of the southern territories of Kerala through displacement and adoptions including the Travancore Royal Family. Many of the members of Travancore Royal Family were adopted from various branches of Parappanad Royal Family. The original headquarters of Kingdom of Cochin was at Perumpadappu in South Malabar. The Cochin used to adopt members from Kingdom of Tanur. Being home to the prominent figures like Thunchaththu Ezhuthachan, Poonthanam Nambudiri, Melpathur Narayana Bhattathiri, Kunchan Nambiar, and Zainuddin Makhdoom II, South Malabar was the cultural capital of medieval Kerala. The Kerala school of astronomy and mathematics flourished between the 14th and 16th centuries. In attempting to solve astronomical problems, the Kerala school independently created a number of important mathematics concepts, including series expansion for trigonometric functions. The Kerala School of Astronomy and Mathematics was based at Vettathunadu (Tirur region).

Colonial period

The northern parts of Kerala were unified under Tipu Sultan during the last decades of eighteenth century CE. When he was defeated by the East India Company in the Third Anglo-Mysore War, the Treaty of Seringapatam was agreed and the regions included in Tipu's kingdom were annexed with the East India Company. After the Anglo-Mysore wars, the parts of Malabar Coast, those became British colonies, were organized into a district of British India. They divided it into North Malabar and South Malabar on 30 March 1793 for administrative convenience. Though the general administrative headquarters of Malabar was at Calicut in South Malabar, the special headquarters of South Malabar was decided to be at Cherpulassery, which was then replaced to Ottapalam. Initially the Malabar was placed under Bombay Presidency. Later in 1799-1800 year, Malabar along with South Canara was transferred to Madras Presidency. The oldest railway line of Kerala was laid at South Malabar in 1860s. South Malabar was the centre of the Malabar Rebellion in 1921. On 1 November 1956, this region was annexed with the Indian state of Kerala.

The Nedumpuram Palace near Thiruvalla belongs to Valluvanad Royal family.

Adoption of Parappanad into Travancore
Lakshmipuram Palace

Lakshmipuram Palace is the royal palace of the Parappanad royal families at Changanassery. Parappanad was originally the ruling family of Parappanangadi in present-day Malappuram district. The palace is located at Puzhavathu near to Kavil Bhagavathy Temple. The Lakshmipuram Palace was built in 1811 AD by Travancore ruler Maharani Ayilyom Thirunal Gouri Lakshmi Bayi (1791–1815)  on behalf of the family of her husband Raja Raja Varma Valiya Koil Thampuran. Until then, the royal family at the Neerazhi Palace in Changanacherry had been moved to newly built Lakshmipuram Palace.

One of the royal families from Parappanad settled in Neerazhi Palace in the 18th century.

Raja Raja Varma Koil Thampuran, father of Travancore Maharaja Swathi Thirunal Rama Varma, was born in Neerazhi Palace in Changanassery. He was part of the royal family of erstwhile Parappanad (Parappangadi and Beypore), Malabar. Maharani Ayilyom Thirunal Gouri Lakshmi Bayi built a new palace in Changanassery for her husband and his family members during her reign in 1811, which was called Lakshmipuram Palace. Until then, the royal family lived in Neerazhi Palace at Puzhavathu.

Kilimanoor palace

In 1705 (ME 880) the son and two daughters of Ittammar Raja of Parappanad royal house were adopted into the Royal house of Venad. Ittammar Raja's sister and her sons, Rama Varma and Raghava Varma, settled in Kilimanoor and married the now adopted sisters. Marthanda Varma, the founder of the Kingdom of Travancore, was the son of Raghava Varma. The nephew of Raghava Varma, Ravi Varma Koil Thampuran, married the sister of Marthanda Varma. Their son became known as Dharma Raja Kartika Thirunnal Rama Varma.

In 1740 when an allied force, led by Dutchman Captain Hockert supporting the Deshinganadu King, attacked Venad, an army from Kilimanoor resisted and then defeated them. Although a small victory, this was the first time an Indian army had defeated a European power. In 1753, in recognition of this feat, Marthanda Varma exempted the areas controlled by the Kilimanoor palace from taxes, and granted them autonomous status. The present palace complex was built at this time, together with the Ayyappan temple. for the family deity, Sastha or Ayyapan.

Velu Thampi Dalawa held meetings at Kilimanoor palace while planning uprisings against the British. He handed over his sword at the palace before going into his final battle against the British, and India's first President, Dr Rajendra Prasad received this sword from the palace and it was kept in the National Museum in Delhi. Afterwards the sword was moved to the Napier Museum, Trivandrum.

Geography

The term South Malabar refers to the region of the erstwhile Malabar District which lies south to the river Korapuzha and bears high cultural similarity with both the Central Kerala (Thrissur-Kochi region) and the North Malabar region.
 
Three of the largest five rivers in Kerala, Bharathappuzha, Chaliyar, and Kadalundi River, flow through South Malabar. South Malabar region has several small and medium-sized tributaries of these rivers too. Bhavani River, a tributary of River Kaveri also flows through here. The Palakkad Gap, which is also the largest gap in the Kerala portion of Western Ghats and connects Kerala with Tamil Nadu by road through Coimbatore city, is located in South Malabar. Thus the region is also known as The Gateway of Kerala. South Malabar is located in rich biodiversity of the Nilgiri Biosphere Reserve and teak plantations, thus becoming home to the places such as Karimpuzha Wildlife Sanctuary, New Amarambalam Reserved Forest, and Nedumkayam Rainforest in Nilambur Taluk of Malappuram district, and Silent Valley National Park and Attappadi Reserved Forest in Mannarkkad Taluk of Palakkad district. The eastern regions in the modern-day districts of Wayanad, Malappuram (Chaliyar valley at Nilambur), and Palakkad (Attappadi Valley), which together form parts of the Nilgiri Biosphere Reserve and a continuation of the Mysore Plateau, are known for natural Gold fields, along with the adjoining districts of Karnataka.

The highest peaks in the erstwhile Malabar District were located in Nilambur region of Eranad (Eastern Eranad) on the vicinity of Nilgiri Mountains. The 2,554 m high Mukurthi peak, which is situated in the border of modern-day Nilambur Taluk and Ooty Taluk, and is also the fifth-highest peak in South India as well as the third-highest in Kerala after Anamudi (2,696 m) and Meesapulimala (2,651 m), was the highest point of elevation in Malabar district. It is also the highest peak in Kerala outside the Idukki district. The 2,383 high Anginda peak, which is located closer to Malappuram-Palakkad-Nilgiris district border is the second-highest peak. Vavul Mala, a 2,339 m high peak situated on the trijunction of Nilambur Taluk of Malappuram, Wayanad, and Thamarassery Taluk of Kozhikode districts, was the third-highest point of elevation in the district. Apart from the main continuous range of Western Ghats, there were many small undulating hills in the lowland of the district.

A number of dams have been built across the tributaries of the river Bharathappuzha, the largest being the Malampuzha dam. The largest in volume capacity is the Parambikulam Dam The South Malabar region is nicknamed "the granary of Kerala". The backwaters such as Biyyam, Canals such as Conolly Canal, and Ponnani Kole Wetlands are also present in South Malabar region.

In the British records, Eastern Eranad region was collectively described as Nilambur Valley. The bank of river Chaliyar at Nilambur region is also known for natural Gold fields. Explorations done at the valley of the river Chaliyar in Nilambur has shown reserves of the order of 2.5 million cubic meters of placers with 0.1 gram per cubic meter of gold. Eranad has several tributaries of Chaliyar river and Kadalundi river.

Transportation

 Roads 
Kozhikode

National Highway 66 connects Kozhikode to Mumbai via Mangaluru, Udupi and Goa to the north and Kochi and Kanyakumari near Thiruvananthapuram to the south along the west coast of India. This highway connects the city with the other important towns like, Kasaragod, Kanhangad, Kannur, Thalassery, Mahe, Vadakara, Koyilandy
Ramanattukara, Kottakkal, Kuttippuram, Ponnani, Kodungallur, North Paravur, Ernakulam, Edapally and proceeds to Alappuzha, Thiruvananthapuram and terminates at the southern tip of India, Kanyakumari.

National Highway 766 connects Kozhikode to Bangalore through Kollegal in Karnataka via Tirumakudal Narsipur, Mysore, Nanjangud, Gundlupet, Sulthan Bathery, Kalpetta and Thamarassery.

National Highway 966 connects Kozhikode to Palakkad through Malappuram . At Ramanattukara, a suburb of Kozhikode, it joins NH 66. It passes through towns like Kondotty, Perinthalmanna, and Mannarkkad and Malappuram. This stretch connects the city and Calicut International Airport.

SH 29 passes through the city. It connects NH 212, Malabar Christian College, civil station, Kunnamangalam, Thamarassery, Chellot, Chitragiri and Road to Gudallor from Kerala border.

SH 54 connects the city to Kalpetta. The highway passes through Pavangad, Kozhikode, Ulliyeri, Perambra, Poozhithodu, Peruvannamuzhi and Padinjarethara.
SH 68 starts from Kappad and ends in Adivaram.

SH 34 starts from Koyilandy and ends in Edavanna which is 44.0 km long. This highway passes through Koyilandi, Ulliyeri, Balussery, Thamarassery, Omassery, Mukkam.

Buses, predominantly run by individual owners, ply on the routes within the city and to nearby locations. City buses are painted green. Kerala State Road Transport Corporation (KSRTC) runs regular services to many destinations in the state and to the neighbouring states. The city has three bus stands. All private buses to the suburban and nearby towns ply from the Palayam Bus Stand. Private buses to adjoining districts start from the Mofussil Bus Stand on Indira Gandhi Road (Mavoor Road). Buses operated by the KSRTC drive from the KSRTC bus stand on Indira Gandhi Road. KSRTC Bus Stand Kozhikode is the largest bus stand in Kerala having a size of 36,036.47 meter square. There are also KSRTC depots in Thamarassery, Thottilpalam, Thiruvambady and Vatakara.
There are three routes available to Bangalore. Kozhikode–Sulthan Bathery-Gundlupet–Mysore–Bangalore is the preferred one and is very busy. Another route, is Kozhikode-Manathavady-Kutta-Mysore-Bangalore. The third one, less used, is Kozhikode–Gundlupet–Chamarajanagar–Kollegal–Bangalore.

Private tour operators maintain regular luxury bus services to Mumbai, Bangalore, Coimbatore, Chennai, Vellore, Ernakulam, Trivandrum, Ooty, Mysore. etc. and mainly operate from the Palayam area. These are usually night services.

Malappuram

Malappuram is well connected by roads. There are four KSRTC stations in district. 2 National highways pass through district- NH 66 and NH 966. NH 66 reaches the district through Ramanattukara and connects the cities/towns including Tirurangadi, Kakkad, Kottakkal, Valanchery, Kuttippuram, and Ponnani and goes out from district through Chavakkad. Major cities/towns those are connected through NH 966 include Kondotty (Karipur Airport), Malappuram, and Perinthalmanna. The State Highways in the district are SH 23 (Shornur-Perinthalmanna), SH 28 (Malappuram-Vazhikadavu), SH 34 (Quilandy-Edavanna), SH 39 (Perumbilavu-Nilambur), SH 53 (Mundur-Perinthalmanna), Hill Highway, SH 60 (Angadipuram-Cherukara), SH 62 (Guruvayur-Ponnani), SH 65 (Parappanangadi-Areekode), SH 69 (Thrissur-Kuttipuram), SH 70 (Karuvarakundu - Melattur), SH 71 (Tirur-Manjeri), SH 72 (Malappuram - Tirurangadi), and SH 73 (Valanchery-Nilambur). The length of road maintained by Kerala PWD in district is 2,680 km. Out of this, 2,305 km constitute district roads. The remaining 375 km consists of State Highways. The Nadukani Churam Ghat Road connects Malappuram with Nilgiris.

The Nadukani-Parappanangadi Road connects the coastal area of Malappuram district with the easternmost hilly border at Nadukani Churam bordering Nilgiris district of Tamil Nadu, near Nilambur. Beginning from Parappanangadi, It passes through other major towns such as Tirurangadi, Malappuram, Manjeri, and Nilambur, before reaching the Nadukani Ghat Road.

The first modern kind of road in the district was laid in eighteenth century by Tipu Sultan. The road from Tirur to Chaliyam via Tanur, Parappanangadi, and Vallikkunnu was projected by him.  Tipu had also projected the roads from Malappuram to Thamarassery, from Malappuram to Western Ghats, from Feroke to Kottakkal via Tirurangadi, and from Kottakkal to Angadipuram.

Palakkad
Palakkad has a medium-grade network of roads. The National Highway 544 from Salem to Ernakulam via Coimbatore, Palakkad and Thrissur passes through the city. National Highway 966 starts from Palakkad and joins NH 66 at Ramanattukara in Kozhikode .  Another important road is the Palakkad – Ponnani road which connects NH 544 and Mumbai-Kanyakumari coastal NH 66. There are also some State highways which starts and passes through district connecting all major towns and cities of the state.

Palakkad city has four Bus Stations includes KSRTC Terminal Palakkad and three Private Bus stands named Stadium Bus Stand, Municipal Bus stand, and Town Bus Stand. Stadium Stand is the largest private bus stand in the city. Services to city suburbs and other areas of the district starts from here. Services to Thrissur and Pollachi also starts from here. Services to Kozhikode, Mannarkkad, Cherpulassery, Kongad,  Sreekrishnapuram and Kadampazhipuram starts from Municipal stand. The buses to western parts of the district Ottapalam, Shoranur, Pattambi and towards Guruvayur starts from Town bus stand. Palakkad KSRTC depot is second most revenue generating KSRTC depot in the state after Trivandrum. Palakkad KSRTC depot is the only depot in district. Sub depot is present at Chittur serving Chittur-Thathamangalam. Operating centres are present at Vadakkenchery and Mannarkkad serving the respective towns. KSRTC Station Master office is present at Pattambi.

 Railways 
Kozhikode
Kozhikode railway station also known as Calicut railway station, is the largest railway station in the city of Calicut, India. At  in financial year 2018–19, it is the third largest in terms of passenger revenues in Kerala, largest in Palakkad division and the seventh largest in Southern Railway. The station has four platforms, two terminals and a total number of six tracks. The first platform has a capacity to accommodate trains with 24 coaches and second & third platform has the capacity to accommodate 20 coaches; and the fourth one has the capacity to accommodate 24 coaches. It heralds as the only A1-graded station in Palghat railway division with a daily turnout exceeding 25,000 passengers. It is one of the major railway stations in Kerala with trains connecting the city to other major cities in India such as Thiruvananthapuram, Chennai, Bengaluru, New Delhi, Mumbai, Pune, Hyderabad, Coimbatore, Visakhapatnam, Kolkata, Mangaluru, Jammu Tawi, Goa, Ernakulam and so forth.

An integrated security system was installed at the station in 2012 featuring baggage scanners, CCTVs and vehicle scanners. The 125th anniversary of the station was celebrated on 2 January 2013.

The railway line to Calicut (now Kozhikode) was opened to traffic on 2 January 1888 and at that time was western terminus of the Madras Railway. The first line in Malabar was laid between Chaliyam and Tirur, the former an important port town, back then. With the arrival of the new line to Calicut and its growth as an administrative centre, Chaliyam diminished in significance and the railway line to it was subsequently abandoned.

Malappuram

Total length of railway line that passes through the district is 142 km. The railway in the district comes under the Palakkad Railway Division, which is one of the six divisions under the Southern Railway. The history of railways in Kerala traces back to the district. The oldest railway station in the state is at Tirur. The stations at Tanur, Parappanangadi, and Vallikkunnu also form parts of the oldest railway line in the state laid from Tirur to Chaliyam. The line was inaugurated on 12 March 1861. In the same year, it was extended from Tirur to Kuttippuram via Tirunavaya. Later, it was further extended from Kuttippuram to Pattambi in 1862, and was again extended from Pattambi to Podanur in the same year. The current Chennai-Mangalore railway line was later formed as an extension of the Beypore - Podanur line thus constructed.

The Nilambur–Shoranur line is among the shortest as well as picturesque broad gauge railway lines in India. It was laid by the British in colonial era for the transportation of Nilambur Teak logs into United Kingdom through Kozhikode. The Nilambur–Nanjangud line is a proposed railway line, which connects Nilambur with the districts of Wayanad, Nilgiris, and Mysore. Guruvayur-Tirunavaya Railway line is another proposed project. The Ministry of Railways has included the railway line connecting Kozhikode-Malappuram-Angadipuram in its Vision 2020 as a socially desirable railway line. Multiple surveys have been done on the line already. Indian Railway computerized reservation counter is available at Friends Janasevana Kendram, Down Hill. Reservation for any train can be done from here. Malappuram city is served by the railway stations at Angadipuram (17 km away), Tirur, and Parappanangadi (both 26 km, 40-minute drive away). 

Palakkad

The Palakkad railway division is one of the six administrative divisions of the Southern Railway zone of Indian Railways, headquartered in the city of Palakkad. It is the smallest railway division in Southern Railway. It was formed by dissolving the Podanur division. Managing 588 route kilometers of track in the states of Kerala, Tamil Nadu, Karnataka and Mahé (in the Union Territory of Puducherry), it is one of the oldest railway divisions in India.  
The terminal facility of Palakkad division is situated in Shoranur Junction & Mangalore Central of Karnataka state. 
The city is mainly served by two railway stations – Palakkad Junction (located at Olavakkode, about 4 km from Municipal bus stand) and Palakkad Town railway station located in the heart of the Palakkad city. The cities of Thiruvananthapuram, Ernakulam,Coimbatore, Kozhikode,Tiruchirappalli,Salem and Mangalore,  and are connected by the broad gauge line. Train services to Pollachi, Dindigul and Madurai are through the broad gauge line through Palakkad Town station. The Shoranur Junction also has rail connections to Mangalore and the Konkan Railway, enabling travel towards Goa and Bombay. The trains coming from other parts of India are diverted to the north and south Kerala from Shoranur Junction in Palakkad District. From here, there is train service to Calicut, Ernakulam, Trivandrum, Shoranur and Nilambur.
.
Ottapalam,Pattambi,Kanjikode,Kollengode,Puthunagaram,Vallapuzha etc are other major railway stations in the district.

 Airport 
Kozhikode&Malappuram

Kozhikode and Malappuram are served by Calicut International Airport  located at Karipur in Malappuram metropolitan area, about 25 kilometre away from Malappuram City. The airport started operation in April 1988. It has two terminals, one for domestic flights and another for international flights. The airport serves as an operating base for Air India Express and operates Hajj Pilgrimage services to Medina and Jeddah from Kerala. Domestic flight services are available to major cities including Bangalore, Chennai, Mumbai, Hyderabad, Goa, Kochi, Thiruvananthapuram, Mangalore and Coimbatore while International flight services connects Malappuram with Dubai, Jeddah, Riyadh, Sharjah, Abu Dhabi, Al Ain, Bahrain, Dammam, Doha, Muscat, Salalah and Kuwait. There are direct buses to the airport for transportation. Other than buses, Taxis, Auto Rickshaws available for transportation.

According to the statistics provided by the Airports Authority of India in 2019–20, it is the 17th busiest airport in the country and the third-busiest in the state.

Palakkad
However, Cochin International Airport and Calicut International Airport serve the city as well.

There has been a proposal for a mini domestic airport at East Yakkara with respect to setting up domestic airports for enhanced air connectivity by the civil aviation ministry of India. 60 acres has been identified for the project at East Yakkara Palakkad.

Economy
Kozhikode

Kozhikode is the largest economic hub is South Malabar as well as the whole Malabar region. Calicut is one of the biggest economic hubs in Kerala. Nedungadi Bank, the first and oldest bank in the modern state of Kerala, was established by Appu Nedungadi at Kozhikode in the year 1899. Service sector dominates the economy followed by industries. 
Cyberpark, a Government of Kerala organisation, plans to build, operate and manage IT parks for the promotion and development of investment in IT and ITES industries in the Malabar region of Kerala. It would be the third IT hub in the state of Kerala. The two IT parks might create a total 100,000 direct job opportunities. The first project is the development of Cyberpark hub in Kozhikode with its spokes at Kannur and Kazargode IT parks. Other planned projects include the Birla IT park (at Mavoor) and Malaysian satellite city (at Kinaloor) where KINFRA has plans to set up a  industrial park. In 2012, Kozhikode was given the tag of "City of Sculptures" (Shilpa Nagaram) because of the architectural sculptures around the city. Currently there are many IT companies running in UL Cyberpark, Government Cyberpark and Hilite Business Park.

Shopping

The city has a strong mercantile aspect. The main area of business was once Valiyangadi (Big Bazaar) near the railway station. As time progressed, it shifted to other parts of the city. The commercial heart has moved to Mittai Theruvu (Sweetmeat Street or S. M. Street), a long street crammed with shops that sell everything from saris to cosmetics. It also houses restaurants and sweetmeat shops. Today, the city has multiple shopping malls. Focus Mall (First mall of Kerala ), HiLITE Mall, Address Mall and RP Mall are a few among them. Few other malls like Gokulam Mall is ready for opening.

Malappuram

The Gross District Value Added (GDVA) of Malappuram in the fiscal year 2018-19 is estimated as ₹ 698.37 billion, and the growth in GDVA, compared to that in the previous year was 11.30%. The district ranks third in GDVA among the districts of Kerala, after Ernakulam and Thiruvananthapuram, as of 2018–19. The Net District Value Added (NDVA) of the district in the year 2018-19 was ₹ 631.90 billion and the annual growth rate was 11.59%. The Per capita GDVA is calculated as ₹ 154,463 in the fiscal year. The growth rate of GDVA was 18.12% in 2017–18, 9.49% in 2016–17, 7.86% in 2015–16, 8.83% in 2014–15, 14.08% in 2013–14, and 9.70% in 2012–13. It shows a zigzag trend.

The economy of Malappuram significantly depends upon the emigrants. Malappuram has the most emigrants in the state. According to the 2016 economic review report published by the Government of Kerala, every 54 per 100 households in the district are emigrant households. Most of them work in the Middle East. They are major contributors to the district economy. The headquarters of KGB is situated at Malappuram.

Palakkad

The presence of Palakkad Gap and proximity to Coimbatore make Palakkad economically important. Palakkad city is one of the largest industrial hubs in Kerala. Kanjikode area of Palakkad city is the second industrial hub of Kerala after Kochi. Kanjikode is one of the largest industrial areas in Kerala and companies like Indian Telephone Industries Limited (ITI), Instrumentation Limited, Fluid Control Research Institute, Saint-Gobain India Private Limited (formerly SEPR Refractories India Private Limited), Patspin India Ltd, Pepsi, PPS steel (Kerala) Pvt Ltd, United breweries, Empee Distilleries, Marico, Bharat Earth Movers Limited (BEML), Rubfila International Ltd, Arya Vaidya Pharmacy have production facilities.

The commercialization of Palakkad City is Picking up and growing at steady pace in recent years, Nowadays Palakkad City and the suburbs are witnessing rapid amount of commercial and public development activities. The developments are mainly concentrated on the bypass roads, Both Stadium and Calicut bypass roads passing through city are getting major commercial projects. Major national and international branded Retail chains, food Chains, Restaurants, Hotels, Shopping complexes, Textiles, branded jewellers, Vehicle Showrooms, are functioning in and around city. There are many housing colonies consist of Villas and apartments are also present in Palakkad City and suburbs.

Education
Kozhikode

There are 1,237 schools in Kozhikode district including 191 highschools.

Kozhikode is home to two premier educational institutions of national importance: the Indian Institute of Management Kozhikode (IIMK), and the National Institute of Technology, Calicut (NITC). Other institutions include National Institute for Research and Development in Defence Shipbuilding (NIRDESH), Indian Institute of Spices Research (IISR), and National Institute of Electronics and Information Technology (NIELIT) are also based in Calicut.

Recently Kozhikode got Kerala's first residential I.B continuum school, 'The White School International' Located in Perumanna. The school was established in 2016.

This university was established in 1968 and was the second university set up in Kerala. Most of the colleges offering tertiary education in the region are affiliated to this university. The Calicut Medical College was established in 1957 as the second medical college in Kerala. Since then, the institution has grown into a premier centre of medical education in the state. Presently it is the largest medical institute in the state with a yearly intake of 250 candidates for the undergraduate programme.

Main colleges in calicut city: Malabar Christian college, Devagiricollege, Providence college for women, Govt. Arts & science college, West Hill Engineering college, Poly Technic etc.

In 1877, a school for young Rajas was started in Kozhikode. This was later thrown open to all caste Hindu boys. In 1879, it was affiliated to the University of Madras as a second-grade college and with this, collegiate education in the district received a fillip. Secondary education recorded appreciable progress since 1915. The erstwhile Malabar district, of which the present Kozhikode district formed a part, holds a high rank among the districts of Madras Presidency in secondary education.

Malappuram

The Kerala school of astronomy and mathematics flourished between the 14th and 16th centuries. In attempting to solve astronomical problems, the Kerala school independently created a number of important mathematics concepts, including series expansion for trigonometric functions. The Kerala School of Astronomy and Mathematics was based at Vettathunadu (Tirur region).

The district has the most schools in Kerala as per the school statistics of 2019–20. There are 898 Lower primary schools, 363 Upper primary schools, 355 High schools, 248 Higher secondary schools, and 27 Vocational Higher secondary schools in the district. Hence there are 1620 schools in the district. Besides these, there are 120 CBSE schools and 3 ICSE schools.

554 government schools, 810 Aided schools, and 1 unaided school, recognised by the Government of Kerala have been digitalised. In the academic year 2019–20, the total number of students studying in the schools recognised by Government of Kerala is 739,966 - 407,690 in the aided schools, 245,445 in the government schools, and 86,831 in the recognised unaided schools.

The district plays a significant role in the higher education sector of the state. It is home to two of the main universities in the state- the University of Calicut centered at Tenhipalam which was established in 1968 as the second university in Kerala, and the Thunchath Ezhuthachan Malayalam University centered at Tirur which was established in the year 2012. AMU Malappuram Campus, one of the three off-campus centres of Aligarh Muslim University (AMU) is situated in Cherukara, which was established by the AMU in 2010. An off-campus of the English and Foreign Languages University functions at Panakkad. The district is also home to a subcentre of Kerala Agricultural University at Thavanur, and a subcentre of Sree Sankaracharya University of Sanskrit at Tirunavaya. The headquarters of Darul Huda Islamic University is at Chemmad, Tirurangadi. INKEL Greens at Malappuram provides an educational zone with the industrial zone. Eranad Knowledge City at Manjeri is a first of its kind project in the state.

Palakkad

Palakkad city is home to the only Indian Institute of Technology in Kerala. 
Government Victoria College, Palakkad, established in 1866, is one of the oldest colleges in the state. The Government Medical College, Palakkad is started in 2014 is the first Government medical college in the district. The NSS College of Engineering at Akathethara, is the Fourth Engineering Institution established in Kerala, India. The Chembai Memorial Government Music College is one of the main centres of excellence in teaching carnatic music in the state. The Mercy College, Palakkad a women's college established in 1964 is one of the familiar institution in Palakkad city.

Media
Kozhikode
Radio
The Kozhikode radio station of All India Radio has two transmitters: Kozhikode AM (100 kilowatts) and Kozhikode FM [Vividh Bharathi] (10 kilowatts). Private FM radio stations are Radio Mango 91.9 operated by Malayala Manorama Co. Ltd. Radio Mirchi operated by Entertainment Network India Ltd. and Club FM 104.8 operated by Mathrubhumi group and Red FM 93.5 of the SUN Network. AIR FM radio stations are Kozhikode – 103.6 MHz; AIR MW radio station is Kozhikode – 684 kHz.

Television

A television transmitter has been functioning in Kozhikode since 3 July 1984, relaying programmes from Delhi and Thiruvananthapuram Doordarshan. Doordarshan has its broadcasting centre in Kozhikode at Medical College. The Malayalam channels based on Kozhikode are the Shalom Television, Darshana TV and Media One TV. All major channels in Malayalam viz. Manorama News, Asianet, Surya TV, Kairali TV, Amrita TV, Jeevan TV, and Jaihind have their studios and news bureaus in the city.

Satellite television services are available through DD Direct+, Dish TV, Sun Direct DTH and Tata Sky. Asianet Digital TV is popularly known as ACV telecasts daily city news. Spidernet is another local channel. Other local operators include KCL and Citinet.

The Calicut Press Club came into existence in 1970. It is the nerve centre of all media activities, both print and electronic. Begun with around 70 members in the roll, this Press Club, became a prestigious and alert media centre in the state with a present membership of over 280.

MalappuramMalayala Manorama, Mathrubhumi, Madhyamam, Chandrika, Deshabhimani, Suprabhaatham, and Siraj dailies have their printing centres in and around the Malappuram city. The Hindu has an edition and printing press at Malappuram. A few periodicals-monthlies, fortnightlies and weeklies-mostly devoted to religion and culture are also published. Almost all Malayalam channels and newspapers have their bureau at Up Hill. There are so many local cable visions and their regional media. Malappuram Press Club is also situated at Uphill adjacent to Municipal Town Hall. Doordarshan has two major relay stations in the district at Malappuram and Manjeri. The government of India's Prasar Bharati National Public Service Broadcaster has an FM station in the district (AIR Manjeri FM), broadcasting on 102.7 Mhtz. Even without any private FM stations, Malappuram, Ponnani, and Tirur find their own places in the ten towns with the highest radio listenership in India.

Palakkad
Major Malayalam Newspapers include Malayala Manorama,Mathrubhumi, Deshabhimani, Suprabhaatham Daily, The Hindu have printing centers in city and there are also few evening newspapers published from the city. Local news channels like (ACV) are also functioning in city . Palakkad Press Club is located on Robinson road, Sultanpet. A private FM Station operating in Palakkad at Ahalia Campus. There is a long term demand for setting up a government FM Station in Palakkad. At the present total number of 8 cinema halls are operational in Palakkad which screens Malayalam, English, Tamil, Hindi movies, there are few other multiplex screens are under construction and expect to open near future in and around city.

Culture
Kozhikode
Malayalam language
In the field of Malayalam language and literature, Kozhikode district has made many significant contributions. During the 17th century, His Highness Sri Samoothiri Manavedan Maharaja authored the famous 'Krishnattam', a manipravala text describing the childhood of Lord Krishna in eight volumes. The district is famous for folk songs or ballads known as Vadakkan Pattukal. The most popular songs celebrate the exploits of Thacholi Othenan and Unniyarcha. An intellectual debate for Vedic scholars, where winners receive the title of Pattathanam, takes place at Thali temple during the month of Thulam. Kozhikode also has a strong associations with ghazals and football.

Malayalam Literature
Many prominent writers of Malayalam literature hail from Kozhikode. Among them are S. K. Pottekkatt, Thikkodiyan, Punathil Kunjabdulla, U. A. Khader, Akbar Kakkattil, N. N. Kakkad, P. Valsala and M. N. Karassery. S. K. Pottekkatt was perhaps the most celebrated writer from Kozhikode whose award-winning work Oru Theruvinte Katha is set in S. M. Street. Several leading Malayalam publishing houses are based in the city, including Poorna, Mathrubhumi, Mulberry, Lipi and Olive. Several libraries are located in and around the city. The Kozhikode Public Library and Research Centre at Mananchira was constructed in 1996.

Music
In addition to the Malabar Mahotsavam, the annual cultural fest of Kozhikode, every year since 1981 the Tyagaraja Aradhana Trust has been conducting a five-day music festival in honour of Tyagaraja. The festival is complete with the Uncchavritti, rendering of Divyanama kritis, Pancharatna Kritis, concerts by professional artistes and students of music from morning to late in the evening.

Kozhikode has a tradition of Ghazal and Hindustani music appreciation. There are many Malayalam Ghazals. The late film director and play back singer M. S. Baburaj, from Kozhikode was influenced by Ghazal and Hindustani.

Apart, Hindi songs are more popular in this city. Mohammed Rafi Foundation, organises musical nights in the name "Rafi Nite" on birth (on 24 December) and death anniversary of legendary singer Mohammed Rafi. It is estimated that the gathering for this Rafi Nite is the largest gathering for the Rafi nite anywhere in India.

Cuisine
Kozhikode offers a variety of South Indian, North Indian, European, Chinese, Arab, Gujarati and Jain food. The culinary culture of the city has been moulded by Portuguese, Dutch, French, British, Arab and other Indian influence. It offers both veg and non veg dishes in great variety. The mall culture in the city has gained momentum and fast foods are very popular. The new generation is more inclined to Chinese and American food culture and a new trend of vegetarianism is getting popular because of health concerns.

Films
The film history of Kozhikode dates back to 1950s. Some of the main production companies of Malayalam films like Grihalakshmi productions, Kalpaka, Swargachithra, etc. are Kozhikode based companies. The city was also an important hub of top notch film makers like I. V. Sasi and T. Damodaran. Kozhikode produced such notable actors as Ummer, Mammukoya, Balan K. Nair, Santha Devi and Kuthiravattam Pappu. The ever green musician Baburaj, Gireesh Puthenchery, arguably one of the best lyricists in the Malayalam film industry, director, script writer and actor Ranjith, V. M. Vinu, A. Vincent, Shajoon Kariyal, Anjali Menon and cinematographer P. S. Nivas also hail from Kozhikode. Some of the other cine actors like Neeraj Madhav, Madhupal, Anoop Menon, Nellikode Bhaskaran, Augustine and Vijayan Malaparamba are from Kozhikode.

The 1947 Douglas Fairbanks Jr. Hollywood thriller, Sinbad the Sailor, mentions Kozhikode.

Kozhikode, the largest city in the Malabar region, also has a vital role in the entertainment segment. The city's first theatre, Calicut Crown, was opened as early as 1925. The city has more than 10 theatres and two multiplexes, the PVS Film City (the first multiplex in Malabar region) and Crown Theatre.

Sports

Kozhikode is known as the second Mecca of football (after Kolkata). The other most popular games in Kozhikode are cricket, football, basketball, badminton and volleyball. The E. M. S Stadium hosted many international football matches of major football teams in the past. The city is home to many international footballers. One of the famous was Olympian Abdurahman who played for the nation in many international games including Melbourne Olympic games. K.P. Sethu Madhavan, Premnath Phillips, Muhamad Najeeb, M Prasannan, Sudheer etc. are some international footballers from Kozhikode. The seven-a-side form of football is also very famous in the city.
P. T. Usha, is a famous athlete who is regarded as one of the greatest athletes India has ever produced and is often called the "queen of Indian track and field". She is nicknamed Payyoli Express. Currently she runs the Usha School of Athletics at Koyilandy in Kerala.
T. Abdul Rahman, popularly known as Olympian Rahman, was an Indian Olympian footballer from Kozhikode. Rahman was a member of the Indian team that reached the semi-final in 1956 Melbourne Olympics.
Other sports personalities include Jimmy George, Tom Joseph (Indian volleyball player and was captain of Indian volleyball team) and Premnath Phillips.
Jaseel P. Ismail, V. Diju, Aparna Balan & Arun Vishnu are international badminton players from the city.
The Sports & Education Promotion Trust (SEPT) was established to promote sports development in India with focus on football. Started in 2004 and based in Kozhikode, the trust has set up 52 centres called "football nurseries" spread across thirteen districts in Kerala. Since 2010, Calicut Mini Marathon runs have been organised by IIM Kozhikode and witness participation of around 7000 people every year.

Malappuram

The currently adopted Malayalam alphabet was first accepted by Thunchath Ezhuthachan, who was born at Tirur and is known as the father of the modern Malayalam language. Tirur is the headquarters of the Malayalam Research Centre. Moyinkutty Vaidyar, the most renowned Mappila paattu poet was born at Kondotty. He is considered as one of the Mahakavis (a title for 'great poet') of Mappila songs.

Besides Thunchath Ezhuthachan and Moyinkutty Vaidyar, the renowned writers of Malayalam including Achyutha Pisharadi, Alamkode Leelakrishnan, Edasseri Govindan Nair, K. P. Ramanunni, Kuttikrishna Marar, Kuttippuram Kesavan Nair, Melpathur Narayana Bhattathiri, N. Damodaran, Nandanar, Poonthanam Nambudiri, Pulikkottil Hyder, Uroob, V. C. Balakrishna Panicker, Vallathol Gopala Menon, and Vallathol Narayana Menon were natives of the district. M. Govindan, M. T. Vasudevan Nair, and Akkitham Achuthan Namboothiri were the writers hailed from Ponnani Kalari based at Ponnani. Nalapat Narayana Menon, Balamani Amma, V. T. Bhattathiripad, and Kamala Surayya, also hail from the erstwhile Ponnani taluk.

Malappuram was also the main centre of Mappila Paattu literature in the state. Besides Moyinkutty Vaidyar and Pulikkottil Hyder, several Mappila Paattu poets including Kulangara Veettil Moidu Musliyar (popularly known as Chakkeeri Shujayi), Chakkeeri Moideenkutty, Manakkarakath Kunhikoya, Nallalam Beeran, K. K. Muhammad Abdul Kareem, Balakrishnan Vallikunnu, Punnayurkulam Bapu, Veliyankode Umar Qasi, etc., chose Malappuram as their working platform.

The district has also given its own deposits to Kathakali, the classical art form of Kerala, and Ayurveda. Kottakkal Chandrasekharan, Kottakkal Sivaraman, and Kottakkal Madhu are famous Kathakali artists hailed from Kottakkal Natya Sangam established by Vaidyaratnam P. S. Warrier in Kottakkal. The Veṭṭathunāṭu rulers, who had the control over parts of present-day Tirurangadi, Tirur, and Ponnani Taluks, were noted patrons of arts and learning. A Veṭṭathunāṭu Raja (r. 1630–1640) is said to have introduced innovations in the art form Kathakali, which has come to be known as the "Veṭṭathu Tradition". Thunchath Ezhuthachchan and Vallathol Narayana Menon hail from Vettathunad. Vallathol Narayana Menon is also considered as the resurrector of Kathakali in the modern period through the establishment of Kerala Kalamandalam at Cheruthuruthi. Vazhenkada Kunchu Nair, a major Kathakali trainer, and Sankaran Embranthiri and Tirur Nambissan, who were among the most popular Kathakali singers, were also from Malappuram. Kalamandalam Kalyanikutty Amma, who played a major role in resurrecting Mohiniyattam in the modern Kerala, hails from Tirunavaya in the district. Mrinalini Sarabhai, an Indian classical dancer, hailed from erstwhile Ponnani taluk. Arya Vaidya Sala at Kottakkal is one of the largest Ayurvedic medicinal networks in the world. Zainuddin Makhdoom II, the first known Keralite historian, also hails from the district.

Kerala Varma Valiya Koyi Thampuran (Kerala Kalidasan), Raja Raja Varma (Kerala Panini) and Raja Ravi Varma (Famous Painter) are from different branches of Parappanad Royal Family, who later migrated from Parappanangadi to Harippad, Changanassery, Mavelikkara and Kilimanoor. According to some scholars, the ancestors of Velu Thampi Dalawa also belong to Vallikkunnu near Parappanangadi. The Chief Editor of the daily "The Hindu" (1898 to 1905) and Founder Chief Editor of "The Indian Patriot" Divan Bahadur C. Karunakara Menon (1863–1922) was also from Parappanangadi. O. Chandu Menon wrote his novels Indulekha and Saradha while he was the judge at Parappanangadi Munciff Court. Indulekha is also the first Major Novel written in Malayalam language. K. Madhavan Nair, the founder of Mathrubhumi Daily, comes from Malappuram. Ponnani region was the working platform of K. Kelappan, popularly known as Kerala Gandhi, A. V. Kuttimalu Amma, and Mohammed Abdur Rahiman, and several other freedom fighters. Other independence activists from Ponnani taluk included Lakshmi Sehgal, V. T. Bhattathiripad, and Ammu Swaminathan. The ashes of Mahatma Gandhi, Jawaharlal Nehru, and Lal Bahadur Shastri, were deposited in Kerala at Tirunavaya, on the bank of the river Bharathappuzha. K. Madhavanar, who was the translator of Mahatma Gandhi's autobiography into Malayalam, was also a native of Malappuram.

Ponnani's trade relations with foreign countries since ancient times paved the way for a cultural exchange. Persian-Arab art forms and North Indian culture came to Ponnani that way. There were resonances in the language as well. This is how the hybrid language Arabi-Malayalam came to be. Many poems have been written in this hybrid language. Qawwali and Ghazals from Hindustani, who came here as part of their cultural exchange, still thrive in Ponnani. EK Aboobacker, Main and Khalil Bhai (Khalil Rahman) are some of the famous Qawwali singers of Ponnani.

The headquarters of the Azhvanchery Thamprakkal, who were considered as the supreme religious head of Kerala Nambudiri Brahmins, was at Athavanad. The original headquarters of the Palakkad Rajas were also at Athavanad. Several aristocratic Nambudiri Manas are present in the Taluks of Tirur, Perinthalmanna, and Ponnani. Tirunavaya, the seat of the medieval Mamankam festival, is also present in the district. Perumpadappu, the ancestral headquarters of the Kingdom of Cochin, and Nediyiruppu, the ancestral headquarters of the Zamorin of Calicut, are also present in the district. The Kunhali Marakkars had close relationship with the port towns of Ponnani, Tanur, and Parappanangadi. Some of the kings of Kingdom of Cochin in 16th century CE, when Cochin became a major power on the Malabar Coast, were usually borrowed from the royal family of Kingdom of Tanur. Many of the consorts of the queens of Travancore were usually selected from the Parappanad Royal family. E. M. S. Namboodiripad, the first Chief Minister of Kerala, hails from Perinthalmanna in the district. Angadipuram and Mankada, the seats of the ruling families of the medieval Kingdom of Valluvanad, lie adjacent to Perinthalmanna.

During the medieval period, the district was a centre of Vedic as well as Islamic studies. It is believed that Malik Dinar had visited the port town of Ponnani. The Valiya Juma Masjid at Ponnani was one of the largest Islamic studies centre in Asia during the medieval period. Parameshvara, Nilakantha Somayaji, Jyeṣṭhadeva, Achyutha Pisharadi, and Melpathur Narayana Bhattathiri, who were the main members of the Kerala School of Astronomy and Mathematics hailed from Tirur region. The Arabi Malayalam script, otherwise known as the Ponnani script, took its birth during the late 16th century and early 17th century. The script was widely used in the district during the last centuries.

Playwrights and actors from the district include K. T. Muhammed, Nilambur Balan, Nilambur Ayisha, Adil Ibrahim, Aneesh G. Menon, Aparna Nair, Baby Anikha, Dhanish Karthik, Hemanth Menon, Rashin Rahman, Ravi Vallathol, Sangita Madhavan Nair, Shwetha Menon, Sooraj Thelakkad, etc. Sukumaran, who is also the father of two notable actors as well as playback singers of Malayalam film industry namely Prithviraj Sukumaran and Indrajith Sukumaran, also was a native of the district. Playback singers including Krishnachandran, Parvathy Jayadevan, Shahabaz Aman, Sithara Krishnakumar, Sudeep Palanad, and Unni Menon also hail from the district. The district has also produced some notable film producers, lyricists, cinematographers, and directors including Aryadan Shoukath, Deepu Pradeep, Hari Nair, Iqbal Kuttippuram, Mankada Ravi Varma, Muhammad Musthafa, Muhsin Parari, Rajeev Nair, Salam Bappu, Shanavas K Bavakutty, Shanavas Naranippuzha, T. A. Razzaq, T. A. Shahid, Vinay Govind, and Zakariya Mohammed. Most notable painters from district include Artist Namboothiri, K. C. S. Paniker, and T. K. Padmini. Another painter Akkitham Narayanan was from Kumaranellur. M. G. S. Narayanan, one among the most notable historians of Kerala, also hail from here. Social reformers from the district include Veliyankode Umar Khasi (1757-1852), Chalilakath Kunahmed Haji, E. Moidu Moulavi, and Sayyid Sanaullah Makti Tangal (1847 - 1912).

 Cuisine 
The centuries of maritime trade has given the Malappuram a cosmopolitan cuisine. The cuisine is a blend of traditional Kerala, Persian, Yemenese and Arab food culture. One of the main elements of this cuisine is Pathiri, a pancake made of rice flour. Variants of Pathiri include Neypathiri (made with ghee), Poricha Pathiri (fried rather than baked), Meen Pathiri (stuffed with fish), and Irachi Pathiri (stuffed with beef). Spices like Black pepper, Cardamom, and Clove are widely used in the cuisine of Malappuram. The main item used in the festivals is the Malabar style of Biryani. Sadhya is also seen in marriage and festival occasions. Ponnani region of the district has a wide variety of indigenous dishes. Snacks such as Arikadukka, Chattipathiri, Muttamala, Pazham Nirachathu, and Unnakkaya have their own style in Ponnani. Besides these, other common food items of Kerala are also seen in the cuisine of Malappuram. The Malabar version of Biryani, popularly known as Kuzhi Mandi in Malayalam is another popular item, which has an influence from Yemen.

Sports

Malappuram is often known as The Mecca of Kerala Football. Malappuram District Sports Complex & Football Academy is situated at Payyanad in Manjeri. MDSC Stadium was selected as one of two stadiums, along with the Jawaharlal Nehru Stadium, to host the group stages of the 2013–14 Indian Federation Cup. The stadium hosted groups B and D. Kottappadi Football Stadium is a historic football stadium. Other major stadiums include the Rajiv Gandhi Municipal Stadium at Tirur, and the Perinthalmanna Cricket Stadium at Perinthalmanna. A synthetic track is there along with the Tirur Municipal Stadium. Malabar Premier League was initiated in 2015 to strengthen football in the district. The Calicut University Synthetic Track at Tenhipalam is the apex synthetic track in the district. It is associated with the C. H. Muhammad Koya Stadium at Tenhipalam. Other major stadiums of district include those at Areekode, Kottakkal, and Ponnani. A football hub to internationalise the eight major football stadiums of district is proposed. The construction works of two new stadium complexes are being processed in Tanur and Nilambur.

Palakkad
Palakkad has produced several notable poets, playback singers, and actors. The Thrithala-Pattambi region can be described as the cultural capital of Palakkad district.

Sports
Palakkad has produced some world class athletes in the state, Palakkad, Indira Gandhi Municipal Stadium in the center of city was once used for Major sports meets and football matches in state, now the stadium is not in condition for conducting games due to the lack of maintenance, There is a proposal for the renovation of the stadium with international facilities by the Municipality, The city has Fort Maidan also known as Kota Maidanam, is a multi-use stadium in the center of the Palakkad. It is currently used mostly for cricket matches.Fort Maidan holds a maximum capacity of 10,000 people at a time. Up till 2002 the ground was considered for local cricket only. In 2003, Ranji Trophy was introduced in Fort Maidan. The city has an Indoor Stadium located near to Government Victoria College, Palakkad with a total area of 1 Lakh Sq.ft with commercial establishments are still unfinished & incomplete. There is a Synthetic Track with Eight lines operational in the ground of newly constructed Government Medical College, Palakkad.

Malabar Cuisine

The Malabar cuisine depicts it culture and heritage. It is famous for Malabar biriyani. The city of Kozhikode is also famous for Haluva called as Sweet Meat by Europeans due to the texture of the sweet. Kozhikode has a main road in the town named Mittai Theruvu (Sweet Meat Street, or S.M. Street for short). It derived this name from the numerous Halwa stores which used to dot the street.

Another speciality is banana chips,  which are made crisp and wafer-thin. Other popular dishes include seafood preparations (prawns, mussels, mackerel) . Vegetarian fare includes the sadya.

South Malabar cuisine is a blend of traditional Kerala, Persian, Yemenese and Arab food culture. This confluence of culinary cultures is best seen in the preparation of most dishes. Kallummakkaya (mussels) curry, irachi puttu (irachi meaning meat), parottas (soft flatbread), Pathiri (a type of rice pancake) and ghee rice are some of the other specialties. The characteristic use of spices is the hallmark of South Malabar cuisine—black pepper, cardamom and clove are used profusely.

The Malabar version of biryani, popularly known as kuzhi mandi in Malayalam is another popular item, which has an influence from Yemen.  Various varieties of biriyanis like Kozhikode biriyani and Ponnani biriyani are prepared in South Malabar.
 	
The snacks include unnakkaya (deep-fried, boiled ripe banana paste covering a mixture of cashew, raisins and sugar), pazham nirachathu (ripe banana filled with coconut grating, molasses or sugar), muttamala made of eggs, chatti pathiri, a dessert made of flour, like a baked, layered chapati with rich filling, arikkadukka, and more.

However, the newer generation is more inclined towards to Chinese and American food. Chinese food is very popular among the locals.

Tourism
Kozhikode

 Kozhikode Beach
 Mananchira
 SM Street
 Kakkayam Valley
 Sarovaram Bio Park
 Planetarium
 Mishkal Mosque
 Kappad Beach
 Thusharagiri Falls

Malappuram

 Adyanpara Falls- a waterfall at Kurumbalangode.
 Anginda peak - A 2,383 m high peak near Karuvarakundu.
 Arimbra Hills, also known as 'Mini-Ooty'. At a height of 1050 feet above the sea level.
 Arya Vaidya Sala - known for its heritage and expertise in the Indian traditional medicine system of Ayurveda.
 Ayyapanov Waterfalls - A waterfall at Puthanathani, Athavanad.
 Bharathappuzha - The second-longest river in Kerala. Also known in the names River Ponnani, Nila and Perar.
 Biyyam Kayal- A backwater lake at Ponnani
 Chaliyar - The fourth-longest river in Kerala. Conolly's plot, the world's oldest Teak plantation is located on the valley adjacent to Chaliyar. 
 Chamravattom Regulator-cum-Bridge - The largest regulator-cum bridge of Kerala connecting Tirur Taluk with Ponnani port.
 Chekkunnu Mala - A misty green hill near to Chaliyar at Edavanna.
 Cherumb eco-tourist village - An eco-village at Karuvarakundu
 Kadalundi Bird Sanctuary - a dwelling of more than a hundred species of native birds and over 60 species of migratory birds
 Kadalundi-Vallikkunnu community reserve - The first community reserve in Kerala and an eco-tourism spot.
 Kakkadampoyil - A hilly village on the bank of Cherupuzha.
 Keralamkundu waterfalls - Located 1500 ft above the sea level in Karuvarakundu.
 Kodikuthimala - At Amminikadan hills, Perinthalmanna. Also known as Mini-Ooty.
 Kollam Kolli Waterfalls - A waterfall near Areekode.
 Kottakkunnu - At the middle of Malappuram city. Also known as The Marine Drive of Malappuram. An old fort, a water-park, and ancient murals are seen here.
 Kuttippuram bridge - One of the largest as well as oldest bridges built over the river Bharathappuzha, and plays a major role in connecting the Malabar region with the erstwhile Travancore-Cochin via road. 
 Mukurthi - The fifth-highest peak in South India (2,554 m away from sea level).
 Nadukani Churam - A Ghat Road at the northeastern end of Nilambur Taluk, which connects Malappuram district with the hilly district of Nilgiris in Tamil Nadu.
 Nedumkayam Rainforest - A part of the Nilgiri Biosphere Reserve. Known for its greenery.
 New Amarambalam Reserved Forest - A wildlife sanctuary near to Nilambur.
 Nilambur Kovilakam - The headquarter of the Nilambur royal family.
 Nilambur-Shoranur line - one of the shortest broad-gauge railway lines in India with greenery.
 Noor Lake - A lake at Tirur. 
 Oorakam Hill - A mount near Malappuram.
 Poorappuzha River - A scenic coastal tributary of Kadalundi River in Vallikkunnu-Parappanangadi-Tanur area.
 Padinjarekara Azhimukham beach - Two rivers (The Tirur River and the Bharathappuzha) joins with the Arabian sea at here. A beach, an estuary, and a centre of migratory birds at Purathur, opposite to the port of Ponnani.
 Paloor Kotta Falls - A waterfall adjacent to the Paloor fort built by Tipu Sultan near Perinthalmanna.
 Parappanangadi beach - A beach in the coastal town of Parappanangadi.
 Paravanna beach - A scenic beach at Vettom.
 Ponnani beach - A beach in Ponnani.
 Poonathanam Illam - The birthplace of 16th century Malayalam poet Poonthanam Nambudiri near Perinthalmanna.
 Poorappuzha Azhimukham - An estuary at Tanur.
 Silent Valley National Park - Located near Karuvarakundu.
 Tanur beach - A beach at Tanur.
 Teak Museum - The world's first teak plantation in Nilambur.
 Thunchan Parambu - It is the birthplace of Thunchaththu Ezhuthachan, who is known as the father of modern Malayalam language.
 Tirur River - A coconut-fringed green river flowing through Tirur Taluk. Mangrove plantations and Kadavus are seen on its bank.
 Unity hill viewpoint - A viewpoint at Manjeri.
 Unniyal beach - A beach at Niramarutur.
 Vakkad beach - Between Tirur and Ponnani.
 Vallikunnu beach - A coconut-fringed beach in the northwestern coast of district.
 Vavul Mala - A 2,339 m elevated mountain range near Chungathara.

Palakkad

 Attappadi Reserve Forest
 Dhoni Waterfalls
 Elivai Mala
 Fantasy Park
 Kanjirapuzha Dam
 Kannimara Teak
 Karimpuzha Kovilakam
 Kollengode Palace
 Malampuzha Dam
 Malampuzha Garden
 Mampara peak (Raja's cliff)
 Mangalam Dam
 Meenvallam Waterfalls
 Meenkara Dam
 Nelliampathi hillstation
 Palakkad Fort
 Parambikulam Dam
 Parambikulam Tiger Reserve
 Pothundi Dam
 Silent Valley National Park
 Siruvani Dam
 Siruvani Waterfalls
 Varikkasseri Mana
 Walayar Dam

Silent Valley National Park

It is located in the rich biodiversity of Nilgiri Biosphere Reserve. Karimpuzha Wildlife Sanctuary, New Amarambalam Reserved Forest, and Nedumkayam Rainforest in Nilambur Taluk of Malappuram district, Attappadi Reserved Forest in Mannarkkad Taluk of Palakkad district, and Mukurthi National Park of Nilgiris district, are located around Silent Valley National Park. Mukurthi peak, the fifth-highest peak in South India, and Anginda peak are also located in its vicinity. Bhavani River, a tributary of Kaveri River, and Kunthipuzha River, a tributary of Bharathappuzha river, originate in the vicinity of Silent Valley. The Kadalundi River has also its origin in Silent Valley.

Notable people
Kozhikode

Malappuram

Palakkad

See also

 Malabar pepper
 North Malabar
 South Malabar Gramin Bank
 Malabar District
 Calicut International Airport
 University of Calicut
 Kozhikode
 Zamorin
 Palakkad
 Malappuram

 References 

 

 Further reading 
  (The English translation of Tuhfat Ul Mujahideen'')
 
 
 
 
 
 
 
 

Historical Indian regions
Regions of Kerala
1793 establishments in India